The Cambridge Structural Database (CSD) is both a repository and a validated and curated resource for the three-dimensional structural data of molecules generally containing at least carbon and hydrogen, comprising a wide range of organic, metal-organic and organometallic molecules. The specific entries are complementary to the other crystallographic databases such as the Protein Data Bank (PDB), Inorganic Crystal Structure Database and International Centre for Diffraction Data. The data, typically obtained by X-ray crystallography and less frequently by electron diffraction or neutron diffraction, and submitted by crystallographers and chemists from around the world, are freely accessible (as deposited by authors) on the Internet via the CSD's parent organization's website (CCDC, Repository). The CSD is overseen by the not-for-profit incorporated company called the Cambridge Crystallographic Data Centre, CCDC.

The CSD is a widely used repository for small-molecule organic and metal-organic crystal structures for scientists. Structures deposited with Cambridge Crystallographic Data Centre (CCDC) are publicly available for download at the point of publication or at consent from the depositor. They are also scientifically enriched and included in the database used by software offered by the centre. Targeted subsets of the CSD are also freely available to support teaching and other activities.

History

The CCDC grew out of the activities of the crystallography group led by Olga Kennard OBE FRS in the Department of Organic, Inorganic and Theoretical Chemistry of the University of Cambridge. From 1965, the group began to collect published bibliographic, chemical and crystal structure data for all small molecules studied by X-ray or neutron diffraction. With the rapid developments in computing taking place at this time, this collection was encoded in electronic form and became known as the Cambridge Structural Database (CSD).

The CSD was one of the first numerical scientific databases to begin operations anywhere in the world, and received academic grants from the UK Office for Scientific and Technical Information and then from the UK Science and Engineering Research Council. These funds, together with subventions from National Affiliated Centres, enabled the development of the CSD and its associated software during the 1970s and 1980s. The first releases of the CSD System to the United States, Italy and Japan occurred in the early 1970s. By the early 1980s the CSD System was being distributed in more than 30 countries. As of 2014, the CSD System was distributed to academics in 70 countries.

During the 1980s, interest in the CSD System from pharmaceutical and agrochemicals companies increased significantly. This led to the establishment of the Cambridge Crystallographic Data Centre (CCDC) as an independent company in 1987, with the legal status of a non-profit charitable institution, and with its operations overseen by an international board of governors. The CCDC moved into purpose-built premises on the site of the University Department of Chemistry in 1992.

Kennard retired as Director in 1997 and was succeeded by David Hartley (1997-2002) and Frank Allen (2002-2008). Colin Groom was appointed as executive director from 1 October 2008 to September 2017. And most recently, Juergen Harter was appointed CEO in June 2018.

CCDC software products diversified to the use of crystallographic data in applications in the life sciences and crystallography. Much of this software development and marketing is carried out by CCDC Software Limited (founded in 1998), a wholly owned subsidiary which covenants all of its profits back to the CCDC.

Although the CCDC is a self-administering organization, it retains close links with the University of Cambridge, and is a University Partner Institution that is qualified to train postgraduate students for higher degrees (PhD, MPhil).

The CCDC established US applications and support operations in the USA in October 2013, initially at Rutgers, the State University of New Jersey, where it is co-located with the RCSB Protein Data Bank

Contents

The CSD is updated with about 50,000 new structures each year, and with improvements to existing entries.  Entries (structures) in the repository are released for public access as soon as the corresponding entry has appeared in the peer-reviewed scientific literature. Meanwhile, data can also be deposited and published directly through the CSD without an accompanying scientific article as what is known as a CSD Communication.

Periodically, general statistics about the breadth of CSD holdings are reported, for example the January 2014 report. , the summary statistics are as follows:

As of January 2019, the top 25 scientific journals in terms of publication of structures in the CSD repository were:

1.    structures were reported in Inorg. Chem.
2.    structures were reported in Dalton & J. Chem. Soc., Dalton Trans.
3.    structures were reported in Organometallics
4.    structures were reported in J. Am. Chem. Soc.
5.    structures were reported in Acta Crystallogr. Sect. E
6.    structures were reported in Chem. Eur. J. 
7.    structures were reported in J. Organomet. Chem. 
8.    structures were reported in Angew. Chem. Int. Ed.  
9.    structures were reported in Inorg. Chim. Acta 
10.   structures were reported in Chem. Commun. & J. Chem. Soc. 
11.    structures were reported in CSD Communications
12.    structures were reported in Acta Crystallogr. Sect. C
13.    structures were reported in Polyhedron 
14.    structures were reported in Eur. J. Inorg. Chem.  
15.    structures were reported in J. Org. Chem. 
16.    structures were reported in Cryst. Growth Des. 
17.    structures were reported in CrystEngComm
18.    structures were reported in Organic Letters
19.    structures were reported in Z. Anorg. Allg. Chem.  
20.    structures were reported in Acta Crystallogr. Sect. B 
21.   structures were reported in Tetrahedron   structures were reported as Private Communication to the CSD
22.    structures were reported in J. Mol. Struct.
23.    structures were reported in Tetrahedron Lett.
24.    structures were reported in Eur. J. Org. Chem. 
25.    structures were reported in New Journal of Chemistry

These 25 journals account for 704,541 of the 996,193 or 70.7% of the structures in the CSD.

These data show that most structures are determined by X-ray diffraction, with less than 1% of structures being determined by neutron diffraction or powder diffraction. The number of error-free coordinates were taken as a percentage of structures for which 3D coordinates are present in the CSD.

The significance of the structure factor files, mentioned above, is that, for CSD structures determined by X-ray diffraction that have a structure file, a crystallographer can verify the interpretation of the observed measurements.

Growth trend
Historically, the number of structures in the CSD has grown at an approximately exponential rate passing the 25,000 structures milestone in 1977, the 50,000 structures milestone in 1983, the 125,000 structures milestone in 1992, the 250,000 structures milestone in 2001, the 500,000 structures milestone in 2009, and the 1,000,000 structures milestone on June 8, 2019. The one millionth structure added to CSD is the crystal structure of 1-(7,9-diacetyl-11-methyl-6H-azepino[1,2-a]indol-6-yl)propan-2-one.

Note: data for 1923-1964 are aggregated together in the last line of the table.

File format

The primary file format for CSD structure deposition, adopted around 1991, is the "Crystallographic Information file" format, CIF.

The deposited CSD files can be downloaded in the CIF format.  The validated and curated CSD files can be exported in a wide range of formats, including CIF, MOL, Mol2, PDB, SHELX and XMol, using tools in the CSD System.

The CCDC uses two different codes to distinguish between the deposited dataset and the curated CSD entry. For example, one specific ‘CSD Communication’ of an organic molecule was deposited with the CCDC and assigned the deposition number 'CCDC-991327.'  This allows free public access to the data as deposited.  From the deposited data, selected information is extracted to prepare the validated and curated CSD entry which was assigned the refcode 'MITGUT'.  As a part of the curation process, CCDC also applies an algorithm, DeCIFer, to help the editors assign chemistry to structures when those representations (e.g. bond types and charge assignments etc.) are missing from the original CIF files submitted. The validated and curated entry is included in the CSD System and WebCSD distributions, with availability restricted to those making appropriate contributions.

Viewing the data

Each data set in CSD can be openly viewed and retrieved using the free Access Structure service. Through this web-browser based service, users can view the data set in 2D and 3D, obtain some basic information about the structure, and download the deposited data set. More advanced search functions and curated information are available through the subscription based CSD system.

Besides using the CSD system, the structure files may be viewed using one of several open source computer programs such as Jmol. Some other free, but not open source programs include MDL Chime, Pymol, UCSF Chimera, Rasmol, WINGX, the CCDC provides a free version of its visualization program Mercury.

Starting from 2015, Mercury from CCDC also provides the functionality to generate 3D print ready file from structures in CSD.

See also 
 Crystallographic database
 Mercury
 Protein structure

References

External links 
 The Cambridge Crystallographic Data Centre (CCDC) — parent site to CSD

Biological databases
Chemical databases
Chemical industry in the United Kingdom
Crystallographic databases
Databases in the United Kingdom
Science and technology in Cambridgeshire